Baysports is an outdoor watersports centre located on the outskirts of Athlone at Hodson Bay on the west shore of Lough Ree. It is home to Ireland's largest inflatable water park and adjoins the Hodson Bay Hotel. Opened in June 2009, it holds the Guinness World Record for the tallest floating waterslide in the world.

History
Baysports was opened on 22 June 2009 by Fianna Fáil TD, Mary O'Rourke. Launched as part of Ireland's Hidden Heartlands, the state-of-the art €1.5 million boat training and watersports centre aimed to exploit the tourism potential of what backers described as one of Ireland's finest natural amenities in Lough Ree. Roscommon County Council provided Baysports in conjunction with Fáilte Ireland under the National Development Plan 2000–2006.

Activities
Baysports offers certified boat training, adventure sports and watersports activities to all ages on the award-winning floating slides, rockers and climbing challenges, with kayaking, powerboating, boat racing, sailing and rafting also offered. There is also a junior water park near the shore to accommodate families with younger kids.

Awards

References

External links
Official website

Water parks in Ireland
Tourist attractions in the Republic of Ireland
Tourist attractions in County Roscommon
Tourist attractions in County Westmeath
Sports venues in County Roscommon
Sports venues in County Westmeath
2009 establishments in Ireland